Menongue Airport  is an airport serving Menongue, a town and municipality in the Cuando Cubango Province of Angola.

The Menongue non-directional beacon (Ident: ME) is located on the field.

Airlines and destinations

See also
 List of airports in Angola
 Transport in Angola

References

External links
 
 OpenStreetMap - Menongue
 OurAirports - Menongue

Airports in Angola
Cuando Cubango Province